Howard Wilson is a British professor of plasma physics at the University of York. He served as research programme director at the United Kingdom Atomic Energy Authority during 2017-2019, and then as interim Director of the STEP (Spherical Tokamak for Energy Production) fusion reactor programme 2019-2020.

References

Living people
Academics of the University of York
British physicists
Year of birth missing (living people)